Human is the debut studio album released by Northern Irish musician Max Cooper on March 10, 2014 through Fields Records. It features vocal contributions by Kathrin deBoer and Braids.

Track listing

Personnel
Max Cooper – engineering and production
Andy Ramsay – engineering
Rashad Becker – mastering
Ben Slater – artwork

References

2014 albums